Sniper is a series of action and war films beginning with the 1993 film Sniper, which center upon the characters of Master Gunnery Sergeant Thomas Beckett (Tom Berenger) and Gunnery Sergeant Brandon Beckett (Chad Michael Collins), who work as Force Reconnaissance Scout Snipers in the United States Marine Corps.

Films

Sniper (1993)

Master Gunnery Sergeant Thomas Beckett, an experienced sniper, and Richard Miller are sent on a mission to assassinate a Panamanian General.

Sniper 2 (2002)

Thomas Beckett and Jake Cole are tasked with assassinating a Serbian general responsible for ethnic cleansing attacks.

Sniper 3 (2004)

Sniper Thomas Beckett is hired by NSA officials William Avery and Richard Addis to perform a covert operation to eliminate a suspected terrorist kingpin in the People's Republic of Vietnam who was providing support for Jemaah Islamiyah.

Sniper: Reloaded (2011)

With the assistance of Richard Miller, Marine Sergeant Brandon Beckett, son of Thomas Beckett, takes up the mantle set by his father and goes on a mission of his own.

Sniper: Legacy (2014)

After military leaders are assassinated, Gunnery Sergeant Brandon Beckett receives word that his father is one. Attempting to track down the assassin, Brandon finds out that his father is not dead, realizing that he is being used as bait.

Sniper: Ghost Shooter (2016)

Gunnery Sergeant Brandon Beckett is given yet another mission where he is tasked with protecting a Georgian gas pipeline from Arab sponsored terrorists, however, things become complicated when a professional terrorist sniper named Ravshan Gazakov enters the fray.

Sniper: Ultimate Kill (2017)

Master Sergeant Brandon Beckett is tasked with protecting a DEA agent from a drug cartel sniper, known as "The Devil".

Sniper: Assassin's End (2020)

Legendary sniper Thomas Beckett and his son, Special Ops Sniper Brandon Beckett, are on the run from the CIA, Russian Mercenaries, and a Yakuza-trained assassin with sniper skills that rival both legendary sharp shooters.

Sniper: Rogue Mission (2022)
After discovering a human sex trafficking ring working with a corrupt agent, Brandon Beckett teams up with allies from his past, Agent Zeke "Zero Rosenberg" and Yuki "Lady Death" Mifune, to discover the identity of the agent and stop the ring.

Untitled Sniper sequel
On August 15, 2022, an interview with Chad Michael Collins confirmed that a tenth Sniper film was in the works and was scheduled to begin production in September 2022.

Cast and crew

Principal cast

Additional crew

References

External links

Action film series
American film series
Destination Films franchises